Der Abi Saeed (Arabic: دير أبي سعيد) is a city in Irbid Governorate in Jordan. It is named after a historic Christian chapel ('Der' in Arabic) in the place where the city is built. The city gained importance in the early 20th century after the formation of a self-governing body following the fall of the Ottoman Empire. Der Abi Saeed is the administrative center of the Koura Department, one of the nine departments of Irbid Governorate.

Geography

History
In 1838 Der Abi Saeed's inhabitants were predominantly Sunni Muslims.

The Jordanian census of 1961 found 1,927 inhabitants in Deir Abu Sa'id.

Districts
The municipality of Der Abi Saeed includes eight districts:
 Der Abi Saeed
 Kafr Al-Maa
 Al-Samt
 Marhaba
 Abu Alqain
 Jeffin
 Ashrafiyeh
 Tibnah

References

Bibliography

External links

Populated places in Irbid Governorate